Angela Frances Browning, Baroness Browning (born 4 December 1946) is a British Conservative Party politician. She was the Member of Parliament (MP) for Tiverton and Honiton from 1997 to 2010, having previously been MP for Tiverton from 1992 to 1997.

Early life
Angela Frances Pearson was born in Reading, Berkshire. Her father was a lab technician at the University of Reading. She was educated at the Westwood Grammar School for Girls (a grammar school, now called King's Academy Prospect) on Honey End Lane in Reading, University of West London, and the Bournemouth College of Technology. 

She worked in adult education as a home economics tutor from 1968 until 1974. She was an auxiliary nurse for a year in 1976, and was appointed as a sales and training manager with GEC Hotpoint in 1977. In 1985, she became a self-employed management consultant, and also became Director of the Small Business Bureau until 1994. From 1988 to 1992, she was the chairman of Women into Business.

Political career
Browning contested Crewe and Nantwich at the 1987 general election, but was narrowly defeated by the veteran Labour MP Gwyneth Dunwoody by just 1,092 votes. She was selected for the safe Conservative seat of Tiverton following the retirement of Robin Maxwell-Hyslop, who had represented the seat for 32 years. She held the seat comfortably at the 1992 general election with a majority of 11,089. She made her maiden speech on 12 June 1992.

After her election, Browning became a Member of the Agriculture Select committee in 1992. She was appointed the Parliamentary Private Secretary to the Minister of State at the Department for Education and Employment Michael Forsyth in 1993. Also in 1993, she became the President of the National Autistic Society. She entered John Major's government in 1994 when she became a Parliamentary Under Secretary of State at the Ministry for Agriculture, Fisheries and Food, where she remained until the Major government fell. She became a vice president of the National Alzheimer's Disease Society in 1997.

Her Tiverton seat was abolished, but she won the nomination for the newly drawn Tiverton and Honiton seat which she contested at the 1997 general election. She won the new seat with a sharply reduced majority of 1,653.

After John Major resigned from the Leadership of the Conservative Party she ran the John Redwood campaign team. She was appointed as an opposition spokeswoman on Education and Employment under William Hague, but she stepped down in 1998 to look after her autistic adult son, Robin. However, Hague brought her back in 1999 when she entered the Shadow Cabinet as the Shadow Trade and Industry Secretary, and, in 2000, was the Shadow Leader of the House of Commons. After the 2001 general election, she was briefly an opposition spokesperson on Constitutional Affairs, before becoming the Vice Chairman of the Conservative Party 2000–04.

In the 2005 general election, Browning increased her majority to 11,051; almost the majority of the original Tiverton seat she took in 1992.

She was a Member of both the Public Accounts and Standards and Privileges Select Committees.

On 17 November 2006, Browning announced her intention not to stand as a candidate at the 2010 general election.

House of Lords
On 9 July 2010, she was created a life peer as Baroness Browning, of Whimple in the County of Devon, and was introduced in the House of Lords on 13 July 2010, where she sits as a Conservative.

On 11 May 2011, it was announced that Lady Browning would replace James Brokenshire as the Minister for Crime Prevention and Anti-Social Behaviour Reduction in the coalition government following the resignation of Lady Neville-Jones as Security Minister. Lady Browning also became the Home Office Minister of State in the House of Lords, making her the lead for all Home Office business in the Upper House.

She resigned from government on health grounds on 16 September 2011, and was replaced in the Home Office by Lord Henley.

She was interviewed in 2015 as part of The History of Parliament's oral history project.

Personal life
She married David Browning on 6 January 1968 in Bournemouth. They have two sons.

References

External links

Official Website
ePolitix – Angela Browning MP
Guardian Unlimited Politics – Ask Aristotle: Angela Browning MP
TheyWorkForYou.com – Angela Browning MP
Blakes Parliamentary Yearbook
Tiverton and Honiton Conservative Association
The Public Whip – Angela Browning MP voting record
BBC News Profile – Angela Browning 

|-

|-

|-

|-

|-

|-

Living people
1946 births

Alumni of the University of West London
Conservative Party (UK) life peers
Conservative Party (UK) MPs for English constituencies
Life peeresses created by Elizabeth II
Female members of the Parliament of the United Kingdom for English constituencies
Members of the Parliament of the United Kingdom for Tiverton
People from Reading, Berkshire
UK MPs 1992–1997
UK MPs 1997–2001
UK MPs 2001–2005
UK MPs 2005–2010
20th-century British women politicians
21st-century British women politicians